Celaetycheus is a genus of South American wandering spiders first described by Eugène Simon in 1897.

Species
 it contains ten species, all found in Brazil:
Celaetycheus abara Polotow & Brescovit, 2013 – Brazil
Celaetycheus aberem Polotow & Brescovit, 2013 – Brazil
Celaetycheus acaraje Polotow & Brescovit, 2013 – Brazil
Celaetycheus beiju Polotow & Brescovit, 2013 – Brazil
Celaetycheus bobo Polotow & Brescovit, 2013 – Brazil
Celaetycheus caruru Polotow & Brescovit, 2013 – Brazil
Celaetycheus flavostriatus Simon, 1897 (type) – Brazil
Celaetycheus moqueca Polotow & Brescovit, 2013 – Brazil
Celaetycheus mungunza Polotow & Brescovit, 2013 – Brazil
Celaetycheus vatapa Polotow & Brescovit, 2013 – Brazil

References

Araneomorphae genera
Ctenidae
Spiders of Brazil
Taxa named by Eugène Simon